Mramorak (Serbian Cyrillic: Мраморак) is a village in Serbia. It is situated in the Kovin municipality, in the South Banat District, Vojvodina province. The village has a Serb ethnic majority (71.79%) with a present Romanian minority (13.22%) and its population numbering 3,145 people (2002 census).

Historical population

1948: 4,939
1953: 5,204
1961: 5,113
1971: 4,411
1981: 3,888
1991: 3,597

Ethnic groups

See also
List of places in Serbia
List of cities, towns and villages in Vojvodina

http://www.mramorak.de (Donauschwaben in Mramorak)

References
Slobodan Ćurčić, Broj stanovnika Vojvodine, Novi Sad, 1996.
Popis stanovništva, domaćinstava i stanova u 2002, Stanovništvo - nacionalna ili etnička pripadnost - podaci po naseljima, knjiga 1, Republički zavod za statistiku, Beograd, februar 2003.

External links

Populated places in Serbian Banat
Populated places in South Banat District
Kovin